Rdeči Kal (in older sources also Rudeči Kal) is a small village south of Dob pri Šentvidu in the Municipality of Ivančna Gorica in central Slovenia. The area is part of the historical region of Lower Carniola. The municipality is now included in the Central Slovenia Statistical Region.

Church

The local church is dedicated to Saint Anthony the Hermit and belongs to the Parish of Šentvid pri Stični. It was originally an early 16th-century building, but was almost entirely rebuilt in the 19th century.

References

External links

Rdeči Kal on Geopedia

Populated places in the Municipality of Ivančna Gorica